Hilditch is a surname. Notable people with the surname include:

Andrew Hilditch (born 1956), Australian cricketer
David Hilditch (born 1963), Northern Ireland politician
Jacob Hilditch (1864–1930), Norwegian writer
Lal Hilditch (1894–1977), English footballer
Mark Hilditch (born 1960), English footballer
Ron Hilditch, Australian rugby league player and coach
Stephen Hilditch (born 1946), Irish rugby union referee
Thomas Hilditch (1885–1957), English cricketer
Thomas Percy Hilditch (1886–1965), English chemist
Tom Hilditch (born 1965), English journalist and magazine publisher